Hama Tuma (born May 25, 1949) is an Ethiopian poet and writer in the Amharic and English languages.

Biography
Born in Addis Ababa, Ethiopia, Tuma studied Law in Addis Ababa University. He became an advocate for democracy and justice. This has caused him to be banned by three different Ethiopian governments. This situation sharpened his use of satire and he is known as one of Ethiopia's greatest satirists. He has travelled widely but currently lives in Paris with his wife and daughter. His books have been translated into English, Italian, French, and Hebrew.

Bibliography
 The Homeless Prime Minister  (Infinity Publishing 2014)  
 Why Don't They Eat Coltan? (Infinity Publishing, 2010)
 Democratic Cannibalism: African Absurdities III (Infinity Publishing, 2007)
 The Case of the Criminal Walk and Other Stories (Outskirts Press, May 2006)
Give Me a Dog's Life Any Day: African Absurdities II (essays; Trafford Publishing, 2004)
African Absurdities: Politically Incorrect Articles (essays; First Publish, 2002)
Case of the Socialist Witchdoctor and other stories (short stories; Heinemann, 1993)
Of Spades and Ethiopians (poetry; Free Ethiopian Press, 1991)
 Eating an American and Other Poems (1995)
Habeshigna #1 & #2 (two collections of poetry in Amharic)
Kedada Chereka (novel)

External links
African Market
EPRP

Sources 

Gikandi, Simon. The Columbia Guide to East African literature in English since 1945, p. 169 (New York: Columbia University Press, 2007).

1949 births
Living people
People from Addis Ababa
Addis Ababa University alumni
Ethiopian poets
Ethiopian essayists
Ethiopian novelists
20th-century poets
20th-century novelists
21st-century novelists
20th-century essayists
21st-century essayists